Fatih Candan (born 30 December 1989) is a Turkish-German footballer who plays for VfB Bottrop.

He was born in Essen and lives in nearby Bottrop.

References

External links

Fatih Candan at Kicker

1989 births
Living people
German people of Turkish descent
Rot-Weiß Oberhausen players
FC Viktoria Köln players
Kardemir Karabükspor footballers
3. Liga players
Regionalliga players
German footballers
Association football forwards
TSV Steinbach Haiger players
FC Schalke 04 II players
Footballers from Essen